"Rosalinda" is a song by Thalía, released as the fifth single from her album Arrasando.

It is the theme song of Thalía's hit telenovela of the same name.

Background and impact
The song is considered to be a catchy up-tempo mix of pop and cumbia. Thalía usually performs the songs as part of a medley with the theme songs for her other telenovelas such as María la del Barrio and Marimar, all which made her be considered a pop princess and household name.

Single
 Rosalinda (Album Version) - 3:52

Official versions and remixes
 Rosalinda (Album Version) - 3:52
 Rosalinda (Banda Version) - 3:54
 Rosalinda (Tele-Novela Version) - 1:30

Credits
Words and music: Kike Santander
Production and arrangement: Kike Santander, Para Crescent Moon Inc.
Programming and sequencing: Kike Santander, Daniel Betancount
Guitars: Rene Toledo
Bass guitar: Kike Santander
Percussion: Edwin Bonilla
Trombone: Heman "Teddy" Mule
Choir: Kike Santander, Maria de Pombo, Lena Perez
Recording engineers: J.C. Ultoa, Marcelo Añes
Mixing engineer: Sebastian Krys
Assistanr engineers: Gustavo Bonnet, Chris Wiggins
Publisher: F.I.P.P International (BMI)

Charts

References

External links
 

Thalía songs
2001 singles
Spanish-language songs
Songs written by Kike Santander
2000 songs
EMI Latin singles
Songs written by Thalía